John Silvester is an Australian journalist and crime writer. He has written for major Melbourne based newspapers such as The Age, the Sunday Herald Sun and others. Silvester has also co-written a number of bestselling books with Andrew Rule, based on crime in Melbourne. Some of their works formed the basis of the hit Australian TV series Underbelly. He also appears weekly on 3AW's breakfast program as "Sly of the Underworld".

Career 
Silvester received a Bachelor of Arts in politics and legal studies at La Trobe University in 1978, according to an article in the university's Alumni newsletter, Agora, which also stated that his father, Fred Silvester, was a former Victoria Police Assistant Commissioner, and head of the Australian Bureau of Criminal Intelligence. In 2007, Silvester won the Graham Perkin Australian Journalist of the Year for his work covering crime and corruption.

According to his profile at The Age:
John Silvester has been a crime reporter in Melbourne since 1979, moving to The Age in 1993. He has worked with The Sunday Times insight team in London, won an ASEAN-AJA scholarship to study crime and corruption in South East Asia and has given evidence at Royal Commissions on police corruption. Silvester has published more than 30 crime books that have sold more than one million copies. He has won three Walkley awards, six Victorian Press Club Quills, a Ned Kelly award for true crime writing, a Ned Kelly lifetime achievement award and nine Victorian Law awards. He has been judged the Graham Perkin Australian Journalist of the Year and has twice been commended in the same award. He appears regularly on radio station 3AW to discuss crime matters.
He has contributed to several ABC crime documentaries including Terry Carlyon's 2015 two-part documentary on police shootings – Trigger Point. Silvester writes "the Naked City", an award-winning weekly crime column in The Saturday Age. John hosts a true crime podcast, The Naked City.

Personal life 
Silvester is also a passionate supporter of the Hawthorn Football Club. He once fought a draw with former world champion Barry Michael in a charity boxing match.

Bibliography

Inside Victoria: A Chronicle of Scandal, Bob Bottom with John Silvester, Tom Noble & Paul Daley  (1991)
The Silent War: Behind the Police Killings That Shook Australia, John Silvester, Andrew Rule & Owen Davies  (1995)
Underbelly: True Crime Stories, John Silvester & Andrew Rule  (1997)
Underbelly 2: More True Crime Stories, John Silvester & Andrew Rule  (1998)
Underbelly 3: Some More True Crime Stories, John Silvester & Andrew Rule  (1999)
Underbelly 4: More True Crime Stories, John Silvester & Andrew Rule  (2000)
Underbelly 5: More True Crime Stories, John Silvester & Andrew Rule  (2001)
Underbelly 6: True Crime Stories, John Silvester & Andrew Rule  (2002)
Tough: 101 Australian Gangsters: A Crime Companion, John Silvester & Andrew Rule  (2002)
Underbelly 7: More True Crime Stories, John Silvester & Andrew Rule  (2003)
Underbelly 8: More True Crime Stories, John Silvester & Andrew Rule  (2004)
Leadbelly: Inside Australia's Underworld Wars, John Silvester & Andrew Rule  (2004)
Underbelly 9: More True Crime Stories, John Silvester & Andrew Rule  (2005)
Gotcha: How Australia's Baddest Crooks Copped Their Right Whack, John Silvester & Andrew Rule  (2005)
Underbelly 10: More True Crime Stories, John Silvester & Andrew Rule  (2006)
Rats: Crooks Who Got Away With It: Tails of True Crime and Mystery from the Underbelly Archives, John Silvester & Andrew Rule  (2006)
Underbelly 11: True Crime Stories, John Silvester & Andrew Rule  (2007)
Underbelly: The Gangland War, John Silvester & Andrew Rule  (2008)
Underbelly: A Tale of Two Cities, John Silvester & Andrew Rule  (2009)
Underbelly: The Golden Mile, John Silvester & Andrew Rule  (2010) 
Underbelly: The Golden Casket, John Silvester & Andrew Rule  (2010)
Underbelly: Mokbelly, John Silvester & Andrew Rule  (2013)
Underbelly: Where the Bodies Are Buried, John Silvester & Andrew Rule  (2015)
Underbelly: Shot at Close Range, John Silvester & Andrew Rule  (2016)

References

External links
Speaker Profile
List of articles published in The Age

Australian radio personalities
Crime in Melbourne
Living people
Journalists from Melbourne
Year of birth missing (living people)
Ned Kelly Award winners
Australian non-fiction crime writers